Mark Vincent Perkins (born September 27, 1981) is a Canadian former professional baseball pitcher. He played for the Canada national baseball team in the 2006 and 2009 World Baseball Classics.

Career
Perkins was selected by Toronto Blue Jays in 18th round of the 2000 Major League Baseball draft. He remained in Dunedin for the  season. In , he was promoted the Blue Jays' Double-A New Hampshire Fisher Cats.

Perkins began to feel soreness in his elbow in 2004. Later, when playing for the Canada national baseball team in the 2006 World Baseball Classic, he injured his elbow while pitching against Mexico. He rehabbed both of these injuries. At the end of spring training with the Blue Jays, Perkins was placed on waivers. On April 12, 2006, he was claimed by the Milwaukee Brewers and immediately placed on their disabled list. After undergoing Tommy John surgery, he was sidelined for the entire 2006 season.

During the season, he was promoted to their Double-A Huntsville Stars. During the off-season, he was promoted to their Triple-A Nashville Sounds. Perkins was later released by the Brewers and signed to a minor league contract with the Chicago White Sox on March 29, 2008, but was later released.

Perkins signed with the Camden Riversharks of the Atlantic League for the 2008 season.

Perkins started for Team Canada on March 9 in their game versus Italy at the 2009 World Baseball Classic.

References

External links
"Vince Perkins Statistics". The Baseball Cube. 2 February 2008.

1981 births
Living people
Auburn Doubledays players
Baseball people from British Columbia
Brevard County Manatees players
Camden Riversharks players
Canadian expatriate baseball players in the United States
Charleston AlleyCats players
Criollos de Caguas players
Dunedin Blue Jays players
Canadian expatriate baseball players in Puerto Rico
Huntsville Stars players
Iowa Cubs players
Joliet JackHammers players
Leones de Ponce players
New Hampshire Fisher Cats players
Newark Bears (IL) players
Sportspeople from Victoria, British Columbia
Tennessee Smokies players
World Baseball Classic players of Canada
York Revolution players
2006 World Baseball Classic players
2009 World Baseball Classic players